Tubajon, officially the Municipality of Tubajon (Surigaonon: Lungsod nan Tubajon;), is a 5th class municipality in the province of Dinagat Islands, Philippines. According to the 2020 census, it has a population of 8,119 people.

History
Tubajon, which was once a barangay of Loreto, became a municipality on June 21, 1969, under Republic Act No. 5643. According to local folklore, during the Spanish regime, a banca boarded with Guardia Civils landed in the shores of Tubajon in search of a criminal. One of them came across a river and saw a man pounding leaves. Curious, he asked the man, "What will you do with it?" The man answered "Akong Tubajon ang suba aron sayon dakpon ang mga isda" (I will poison the river with Tuba leaves so that the fishes could be easily caught). When the man returned to the group, he narrated everything he saw and heard from the native to his companions. From then on, the place was called Tubajon.

The town became a part of the province of Dinagat Islands in December 2006, when the province was created from Surigao del Norte by Republic Act No. 9355. However, in February 2010, the Supreme Court ruled that the law was unconstitutional, as the necessary requirements for provincial land area and population were not met. The town reverted to Surigao del Norte. On October 24, 2012, however, the Supreme Court reversed its ruling, and upheld the constitutionality of RA 9355 and the creation of Dinagat Islands as a province.

Geography

Barangays
Tubajon is politically subdivided into 9 barangays.
 Diaz
 Imelda
 Mabini
 Malinao
 Navarro
 Roxas
 San Roque (Poblacion)
 San Vicente (Poblacion)
 Santa Cruz (Poblacion)

Climate

Demographics

Economy

References

External links
 Tubajon Profile at the DTI Cities and Municipalities Competitive Index
 [ Philippine Standard Geographic Code]

Municipalities of Dinagat Islands